Yellowtail Dam is a dam across the Bighorn River in south central Montana in the United States. The mid-1960s era concrete arch dam serves to regulate the flow of the Bighorn for irrigation purposes and to generate hydroelectric power. The dam and its reservoir, Bighorn Lake, are owned by the U.S. Bureau of Reclamation.

The project was the result of negotiations between the federal government and the Crow Nation, the tribe of Native Americans that lived on the surrounding Crow Indian Reservation, and was originally envisioned as a shared facility that would provide profits for both sides. The dam was authorized in 1944 and groundbreaking was in 1961; it was completed in 1967 after six years of construction.
Today aside from its original purposes the dam serves for recreation both above and below the structure. Regulation of the Bighorn provided by the Yellowtail Dam has transformed the lower river into one of Montana's premier trout streams.

History

Planning
In the early 20th century, the population of the Yellowstone River valley of southern Montana, of which the Bighorn River is the largest tributary, was growing rapidly and so was the acreage of irrigated land – however, the system was vulnerable to floods and droughts. The leaders of the Crow Nation, which owned the land, agreed to building a dam there because electricity generated there would provide income for the tribe.

Construction of the Yellowtail Dam was authorized by the Flood Control Act on December 22, 1944 as part of the Pick-Sloan Plan, a water management scheme covering the entire upper Missouri River Basin in the north-central United States. Three proposals were then made by the Reclamation Service, the predecessor of the present-day Bureau of Reclamation, during the first half of the century. The first idea called for the building of a  arch gravity dam at the present-day site. Plans for the current dam were finalized in the 1950s, as a high dam would provide a greater hydraulic head, allowing water to be diverted into canals at higher elevations to serve farms both within and downstream of the Crow lands.

The dam is named after Robert Yellowtail, chairman of the tribe during the 1940s. Yellowtail was one of the main opponents of the dam and also protested when the tribe decided to sell the dam site to the federal government. For a while, the Crow Nation considered leasing the land to the government for fifty years at a rate of $1,000,000 per year. The arguments deeply divided the tribe, causing them to separate into two factions, the Mountain Crows, which backed Yellowtail and opposed the dam, and the River Crows, which supported the dam. Eventually, the land was sold for $2.5 million, and controversy continued for years afterward.

Construction
Boise, Idaho based Morrison-Knudsen, at the time the largest heavy contractor in the world, landed the contract to build the dam. Morrison-Knudsen had previously built the Hoover and Grand Coulee Dams. Official groundbreaking for the Yellowtail Dam was in 1961 and the construction of a diversion tunnel was begun soon afterwards. A cofferdam was then raised to divert the Bighorn out of the dam site into the tunnel. The first concrete pour was on March 16, 1963, and the diversion tunnel was closed in November 1965, allowing the river to begin filling Bighorn Lake. The Yellowtail Dam was topped out in December 1967 after six years of work. Surprisingly, for such a huge structure, only one death occurred during the entire construction process.

Characteristics

Dam and reservoir

Aside from the Bighorn River the reservoir is also fed by the Shoshone River, Porcupine Creek, Dry Head Creek, Big Bull Elk Creek, Black Canyon Creek, and smaller tributaries.

Power generation
The dam's hydroelectric plant is located at the base and has a capacity of 250 MW. The plant has four Francis turbines rated at 87,500 horsepower, each capable of driving a 62,500 KW generator. Operations of the facility began in 1966, one year before the completion of the dam. The power station is used based on peaking power demand and thus releases can vary drastically over the course of a day. This dam generally releases a constant flow of  into the Bighorn.

Spillway
To pass flood waters the Yellowtail Dam is equipped with a tunnel spillway on the left side, capable of handling .

In 1967, heavy snowmelt in the Bighorn River basin caused the reservoir to rise to record levels. Reclamation opened the spillway of the dam for twenty consecutive days in June and July of that year. However, the design of the spillway tunnel was flawed, causing severe cavitation of the concrete, leading to the formation of a hole the size of an eighteen-wheeler in the concrete lining. The resulting repairs and retrofits to the spillway were the vital predecessor to the repair work to dams such as Hoover, Glen Canyon and Flaming Gorge that would follow severe floods in 1983 in the Colorado River basin.

Recreation

However, the dam has significantly changed the native riverine habitat downstream as well – cutting off the supply of sediments, which once created islands and sandbars in the Bighorn's winding lower course.

In recent years there has been controversy between Montana and Wyoming over whether more water should be kept in Bighorn Lake for boating and water-skiing uses (almost two-thirds of the surface area of Bighorn Lake is in Wyoming), or released from the dam to maintain the trout fishery downstream. The lower flows have led to unhealthy trout populations in turn causing the fishing industry on the lower Bighorn to decline by over 40 percent. However, low water levels in the lake have caused recreational usage in Wyoming to drop more than 60%. In an attempt to reduce tensions between the two states Reclamation has agreed to keep the lake at a higher level while maintaining at least  of flow below the dam.

See also

Bighorn Basin

List of reservoirs and dams in the United States

References

Works cited

External links 
 Series 29: Yellowtail Dam #1. 

Dams in Montana
Hydroelectric power plants in Montana
Buildings and structures in Big Horn County, Montana
United States Bureau of Reclamation dams
Bighorn Canyon National Recreation Area
Reservoirs and dams in National Park Service units
Dams completed in 1967
1967 establishments in Montana